The 2004 Grand Prix de Tennis de Lyon was a men's tennis tournament played on indoor carpet courts. It was played at the Palais des Sports de Gerland in Lyon, France, and was part of the 2004 ATP Tour. It was the 18th edition of the tournament and took place from 4 October through 11 October 2004. Unseeded Robin Söderling won the singles title.

Finals

Singles

 Robin Söderling defeated  Xavier Malisse 6–2, 3–6, 6–4
 It was Söderling's only title of the year and the 1st of his career.

Doubles

 Jonathan Erlich /  Andy Ram defeated  Jonas Björkman /  Radek Štěpánek 7–6(7–2), 6–2
 It was Erlich's only title of the year and the 4th of his career. It was Ram's only title of the year and the 4th of his career.

External links

External links
 ITF tournament edition details

 
Grand Prix de Tennis de Lyon
Grand Prix de Tennis de Lyon